Ramkaran Ramperass (born 12 February 1960) is a Trinidadian cricketer. He played in two first-class and two List A matches for Trinidad and Tobago in 1981/82 and 1982/83.

See also
 List of Trinidadian representative cricketers

References

External links
 

1960 births
Living people
Trinidad and Tobago cricketers